The 3rd Assembly of Gilgit Baltistan was elected on 15 November 2020 polls held across the province of Gilgit Baltistan. The party position and the distribution of reserved seats is shown below. The new session of the Gilgit-Baltistan Assembly had summoned on 25 November 2020.

Party Position

List of Members of the 3rd Assembly of Gilgit Baltistan 
Members of the 3rd Assembly of Gilgit Baltistan are as follows:

†Elected as an Independent but joined the party after the election.
⥾Basic Member of Majlis Wahdat-e-Muslimeen

References

Gilgit-Baltistan Legislative Assembly constituencies
Members of the Gilgit-Baltistan Legislative Assembly